is a village located in Yoshino District, Nara Prefecture, Japan.

As of April 2017, the village has an estimated population of 745 and a density of 16 persons per km². The total area is 47.71 km².

Geography
Located north of Mount Yoshino, it is part of the municipalities in the Kii Mountain Range.
 Mountains : Mount Kashihara, Hyakukaidake

Surrounding municipalities
 Nara Prefecture
 Gojō city
 Yoshino town
 Kawakami village
 Tenkawa village
 Shimoichi town

History
 1889 - Minamiyoshino village is created in Yoshino District
 1912 - Minamiyoshino village is divided into Kurotaki village and Niu village
 1949 - A portion of the village is merged into Akino village (now Shimoichi town)

References

External links

 Kurotaki official website 

Villages in Nara Prefecture